The Indian state Kerala is well known for its diverse forms of performing arts. The various communities in Kerala contribute to its rich and colourful culture.The most important traditional art forms of Kerala are Kathakali, Kalaripayattu, Koodiyattam, Theyyam, Mohiniyattam, Thullal, Padayani, Pulikali, Thiruvathirakali, Chakyarkoothu,kalaripayattu etc.

Performing arts of Kerala

Kerala Hindu Arts

 Ayyappan Vilakku
 Shastham Paatu
 Kathakali
 Chakyar Koothu
 Nangiar Koothu
 Mohiniyattam
 Thirayattam
 Padayani
 Thiyyattu 
 Koodiyattam
 Kerala Natanam
 Panchavadyam
 Thullal
 Tholpavakoothu 
 Ottamthullal
 Garudan Thookkam
 Kolam Thullal
 Kakkarissi Nadakam
 Poorakkali
 Mudiyett
 Kummattikali
 Kuthiyottam
 Thiriyuzhichil
 Kalaripayattu
 Mangalamkali
 Marathukali
 Malayikuthu
 Mukkanchathan
 Charadupinnikkali
 Kothammuriyattam
 Sopanam
 Thacholikali
 Sarpam Thullal
 Pulluvan Paattu
 Poothan and Thira
 Yakshagana in Kasaragod
 Kanyarkali in northern Palakkad district
 Purattu Nadakam in Palakkad district
 Pavakoothu
 Kaalakali
 Thiruvathira
 Krishnanattam
 Koodiyattam
 Vadyakala
 Villadicham pattu
 Theyyam
 Onapottan
 Pettathullal

Kerala Muslim arts
 Oppana
 Mappila Paattu
 Kolkali
 Duff Muttu
 Arabana muttu
 Muttum Viliyum
 Vattapattu

Kerala Christian arts

 Margam Kali
 Chavittu Nadakam
 Parichamuttukali
 Slama Carol
 Othiyattam
 Ayanippattu
 Poovirukkam

Others

 Kadhaprasangam
 Nadodi Nrittham
 Puli Kali

Fine arts of Kerala
 Murals of Kerala

Arts promotion bodies
 Kerala Kalamandalam
 Kerala Lalitakala Academy
 Kerala Sangeetha Nadaka Academy, Thrissur
 Kerala Folklore Academy
Guru Gopinath Nadana Gramam

See also 
 Culture of Kerala
 Music of Kerala
 Triumvirate poets of modern Malayalam

References

 

 
Culture of Kerala